Kanal Sport, was a sports TV-channel, broadcasting from Denmark, in Danish. The channel was free to watch, and was to be found as an online stream on the internet and in the ground packs of some Danish TV providers.

The channel airs lower leagues in football, team handball and other sports. Some examples may be the Danish U/19 national football team, the U/19, U/20 European Handball Championships, Danish volleyball league, lower Danish ice hockey leagues and the Danish third tier of association football.

History
On 17 June 2015, forum.yousee.dk announced that Kanal Sport closes.

References

External links
 

Defunct television channels in Denmark
Television channels and stations established in 2012
Television channels and stations disestablished in 2015
2012 establishments in Denmark
2015 disestablishments in Denmark
Sports television in Denmark